IV Cavalry Corps may refer to:

 IV Cavalry Corps (German Empire), a formation of the German Army in World War I
 IV Cavalry Corps (Grande Armée), a French military formation that existed during the Napoleonic Wars